The Supreme Court of Judicature Act 1910 (10 Edw 7 & 1 Geo 5 c 12) was an Act of the Parliament of the United Kingdom.

It was one of the Judicature Acts 1873 to 1910.

See also
Supreme Court of Judicature Act

References
The Public General Acts passed in the Tenth Year of the Reign of His Majesty King Edward the Seventh and the First Year of the Reign of His Majesty King George the Fifth. Printed for HMSO by the King's Printer. London. 1910. Pages 102 and 103.

United Kingdom Acts of Parliament 1910